Tirzah or Thyrza may refer to:

 Tirzah (name)
 To Tirzah, a poem by William Blake
 Tirzah (ancient city)
 Tirzah Stream
 Tirzah, South Carolina, a city of South Carolina
 the minor planet 267 Tirza
 the novel Thyrza by George Gissing
 Tirzah (musician), an English singer